The Hollywood Bowl is an amphitheatre in the Hollywood Hills neighborhood of Los Angeles, California. It was named one of the 10 best live music venues in America by Rolling Stone magazine in 2018.

The Hollywood Bowl is known for its distinctive bandshell, originally a set of concentric arches that graced the site from 1929 through 2003, before being replaced with a larger one to begin the 2004 season. The shell is set against the backdrop of the Hollywood Hills and the famous Hollywood Sign to the northeast.

The "bowl" refers to the shape of the concave hillside into which the amphitheater is carved. The Bowl is owned by the County of Los Angeles and is the home of the Hollywood Bowl Orchestra, the summer home of the Los Angeles Philharmonic, and the host venue for hundreds of musical events each year.

It is located at 2301 North Highland Avenue, west of the (former) French Village. It is north of Hollywood Boulevard and approximately 1 mile (1.6 km) from the Hollywood/Highland Metro Rail station. It is adjacent to U.S. Route 101.

History

Siting and opening
The site of the Hollywood Bowl was chosen in 1919 by William Reed and his son H. Ellis Reed, who were dispatched to find a suitable location for outdoor performances by the members of the newly formed Theatre Arts Alliance, headed by Christine Wetherill Stevenson. The Reeds selected a natural amphitheater, a shaded canyon and popular picnic spot known as 'Daisy Dell' in Bolton Canyon, which was chosen for its natural acoustics and its proximity to downtown Hollywood. The Community Park and Art Association, then headed by F. W. Blanchard, was the first organization to begin building the Bowl.

One of the earliest performances at the Bowl was Hollywood High School's Performance of Shakespeare's Twelfth Night. The Women's World Peace Concert was held on November 11, 1921. On November 11, 1921, the first Sunrise Service took place at the bowl, in one of its first major events. With the building of the first actual stage, consisting of little more than wooden platforms and canvas, The Bowl officially opened on July 11, 1922.

Community function 
The Bowl began as a community space rather than a privately owned establishment. Proceeds from the early events at the Bowl went to financing the construction of new elements of the bowl such as a stage and seating in 1922 and 1923 respectively. In 1924, a backdrop to the stage was added.

During the early years of the Bowl's existence, concert tickets were kept at the lowest available price of 25 cents using the slogan popular prices will prevail, coined by F.W. Blanchard. While serving as the venue for concerts by the Los Angeles Philharmonic, the Bowl also served as a community space, used for Easter services, the Hollywood Community Chorus, as well as Young Artists Nights where younger musicians could perform well-known classical music. Children were also invited to perform at community events with the Los Angeles Philharmonic and the Hollywood Community Chorus, beginning with Sibelius’ Finlandia in 1921.

The Bowl was home to much more than western music, hosting a variety of Native American tribal events, as well as international music ensembles. 

In 1924, the land was deeded to the County of Los Angeles.

Women in the Bowl 
Many of the key influential figures in the founding of the Hollywood Bowl were women, most notably the pianist Artie Mason Carter, whose connections with the Los Angeles arts patrons were vital in the early days of the Bowl's existence. Christine Wetherill Stevenson and Marie Rankin Clarke both donated $21,000 to purchase the land on which the bowl was built. E.J. Wakeman, Leiland Atherton Irish, Harriet Clay Penman, and composers Gertrude Ross and Carrie Jacobs Bond all contributed to the Bowl through fundraising drives.

Band shells

Frank Lloyd Wright, Jr. (commonly known as Lloyd Wright) designed the second and third band shells. The original 1926 shell, designed by the Allied Architects group, was considered unacceptable both visually and acoustically. Wright's 1927 shell had a pyramidal shape and a design reminiscent of southwest American Indian architecture. Its acoustics generally were regarded as the best of any shell in Bowl history. But its appearance was considered too avant-garde, or even ugly, and it was demolished at the end of the season. His 1928 wooden shell had the now-familiar concentric ring motif, covered a 120-degree arc, and was designed to be easily dismantled. Unfortunately it was neglected and ruined by water damage.

For the 1929 season, the Allied Architects built the shell that stood until 2003, using a transite skin over a metal frame. Its acoustics, though not nearly as good as those of the Lloyd Wright shells, were deemed satisfactory at first, and its clean lines and white, semicircular arches were copied for music shells elsewhere. As the acoustics deteriorated, various measures were used to mitigate the problems, starting in the 1970s with an inner shell made from large cardboard tubes, which were replaced in the early 1980s by large fiberglass spheres (both designed by Frank Gehry) that remained until 2003. 

These dampened the unfavorable acoustics, but required massive use of electronic amplification to reach the full audience, particularly since the background noise level had risen sharply since the 1920s. The appearance underwent other visual changes as well, including the addition of a broad outer arch (forming a proscenium) where it had once had only a narrow rim, and a reflecting pool in front of the stage that lasted from 1953 till 1972. Sculptor George Stanley, designer of the Oscar statuette, designed the Muse Fountain which has stood outside the Hollywood Bowl's main entrance since 1940.

Shortly after the end of the 2003 summer season, the 1929 shell was replaced with a new, somewhat larger, acoustically improved shell, which had its debut in the 2004 summer season. Preservationists fiercely opposed the demolition for many years, citing the shell's storied history. However, even when it was built, the 1929 shell was (at least acoustically) only the third-best shell in the Bowl's history, behind its two immediate predecessors. By the late 1970s, the Hollywood Bowl became an acoustic liability because of continued hardening of its transite skin. The new shell incorporates design elements of not only the 1929 shell, but of both the Lloyd Wright shells. During the 2004 summer season, the sound steadily improved, as engineers learned to work with its live acoustics.

The current sound reinforcement system is a line-array configuration of multiple loudspeaker enclosures hung vertically in a curved manner, with the lower enclosures facing the front sections, and the upper enclosures angled towards the rear sections. It is manufactured by L'Acoustics, and includes state-of-the-art audio processing, allowing each individual loudspeaker enclosure to be "tuned" and directed towards the near-precise location of the listener, regardless of where in the venue they are sitting. This results in the audience in the rear sections hearing the same audio, at the same level, as in the front sections.

This electronic processing includes sound level, frequency equalization, occasional special effects, and time delay. Sound passes through wire much faster than through air, therefore the sound coming from the speakers must be delayed, allowing the actual sound from the stage to "catch up" so both sources reach the listeners' ears simultaneously. The system is maintained by Rat Sound Systems, the same company that has provided audio for the Coachella Festival, since its inception.

The 2004 shell incorporates the prominent front arch of the 1926 shell, the broad profile of the 1928 shell, and the unadorned white finish (and most of the general lines) of the 1929 shell. In addition, the ring-shaped structure hung within the shell, supporting lights and acoustic clouds, echoes a somewhat similar structure hung within the 1927 shell. During the 2004 season, because the back wall was not yet finished, a white curtain was hung at the back; beginning with the 2005 season, the curtain was removed to reveal a finished back wall. The architectural design for the shell was developed by the Los Angeles-based architectural practice Hodgetts and Fung, with the structural concept developed by the local office of Arup.

At the same time the new shell was being constructed the bowl received four new video screens and towers. During most concerts, three remotely-operated cameras in the shell, and a fourth, manually-operated camera among the box seats, provide the audience with close-up views of the musicians.

Hollywood Bowl Orchestra(s) 
The Hollywood Bowl has had several house orchestras. A "Bowl Orchestra" performed in 1925, and a "Hollywood Bowl Orchestra" made a live recording in 1928. Later, the "Hollywood Bowl Symphony Orchestra" made several classical recordings under music director Leopold Stokowski from 1945 to 1946, and released a number of recordings on the Capitol Records label in the 1950s and 1960s.

The Hollywood Bowl Orchestra was re-launched by the Los Angeles Philharmonic Association in 1991 under principal conductor John Mauceri, who finished his tenure in 2006.

Early conductors

The first appointed conductor of the Bowl ensemble was Emil Oberhoffer, who served for one year. Oberhoffer was proceeded by Alfred Hertz for two years. In 1925 Fritz Reiner migrated to the orchestra from the Cincinnati Symphony. Reiner was supplanted by Sir Henry Wood several years later.. German-born Frederick Stark, who would later become a music librarian at Walt Disney Studios, occasionally served as conductor.

Early ballet and opera 
Ballet dancer Maud Allen performed during the production of the Pathétique Symphony by Tschaikowsky under the direction of Alfred Hertz in 1926. Ernest Belcher arranged a ballet scene for Bowl Dedication Night, and dancers from the Belcher Ballet School performed the Beautiful Galatea, Enchanted Hour, and Venesive Festival. In 1932, the Belcher's ballet was performed in Greek Costumes as a dedication to the Olympic-Games Athletes. Alexis and Theodore Kosloff performed the ballet Scheherazade with dancers from Hollywood and the Klosloff Dancing School. In 1932, Theodore Klosloff performed the Flower. Also in 1932, the ballet Chopiniana was performed.

Ballet Dancers Ruth St. Denis and Ted Shawn performed solo dances under direction of Hertz in 1927. Ruth St. Denis and Ted Shawn raised their arms to point at the California Stars during the Russian Ballet sur le point at the Hollywood Bowl. In 1928, Andreas Pavley, a tenor, and Serge Oukrainsky, a ballet dancer, performed at the Hollywood Bowl. Oukrainsky performed in the ballet La Fete a Robinson alone after Pavley's death. In 1929, Norma Gould brought her Los Angeles dancers to the bowl to perform during Schubert's Unfinished Symphony and Tschaikowsky's Nut-Cracker Suite. In August 1930, Michio Ito brought five dancers to the Hollywood Bowl to perform in the Russian Ballet Prince Igor. In 1931, Adolph Bolm performed at the Bowl for Debussy's Les Nuages. He also performed The Spirt factory. This was later called the Mechanical Ballet, composed by Alaxander Mosolov. Dancers Elise Reiman and Robert Bell also performed in the Mechanical Ballet.

In 1931, Los Angeles Grand Opera performed segments of Marouf. Early Hollywood Bowl appearances of opera include Carmen, Aida, and Shanewis. In 1929, a concertized form of the opera Carmen was performed by Alice Genytle, Paul Althouse and Alexander Kisselburgh. The same cast later performed moments from the opera Tannhäuser. In 1932, Samson and Delilah was performed by Paul Althouse, local singers, the Belcher Ballet and the Civic Chorus in concert style. In 1927, Elsa Alsen performed Santuzza in Cavalleria.

In 1934,  Nina Koshetz performed Carmen and Nelson Eddy sang Escamillo in the opera Carmen. Koshetz also sang the lead in Tschaikowsky's Eugene Onegin. In the 1930s, Verdi's Aida was performed by Dan Gridley, Clemence Gifford, Eleanor Woodforde and Richard Bonelli with the Los Angeles Philharmonic Orchestra. In 1935, Lohengrin was performed, with Jeanette Vreeland performing Elsa and Dan Gridley performing Lonhengrin.

Performances

The first season at the Hollywood Bowl began on July 11, 1922, with conductor Alfred Hertz and the Los Angeles Philharmonic. 

In 1945, Leopold Stokowski formed the Hollywood Bowl Symphony Orchestra, drawing its players from among members of the Los Angeles Philharmonic and various film studios orchestras. He made a number of 78 rpm recordings with them for RCA Victor during his two seasons there (1945–46) before returning to New York. The Hollywood Bowl Symphony's name was retained for a series of Capitol LPs made in the 1950s under such conductors as Felix Slatkin and Carmen Dragon.

In 1951, a financial crisis closed the Hollywood Bowl during its summer season. Dorothy Chandler chaired a committee that organized a series of fundraising concerts that was able to reopen it.

The film-and-orchestra concert Bugs Bunny on Broadway, subsequently called "Bugs Bunny at the Symphony," has played the Hollywood Bowl a record 21 times—19 times with the Los Angeles Philharmonic, and twice with the Hollywood Bowl Orchestra, all conducted by George Daugherty.  In September 2003, "Bugs Bunny On Broadway" was the final Los Angeles Philharmonic concert to be performed in the 1929 shell before its demolition started the following day, making way for the new shell.

1920s

 Tsianina Redfeather Blackstone sang the role of Shanewis in the opera "Shanewis" in 1926.
Rafaela Díaz performed in 1926 as Lionel in Charles Wakefields Cadman's Indian-themed opera "Shanewis."

1930s 

 Claude Lapham's Japanese-inspired opera Sakura premieres with 2,000 performers, and an audience of 10,000. The premiere on June 24, 1933, was a significant moment for Japanese culture in America before World War II. The premiere was followed up by another performance on July 7 that same year.
 August 7, 1936:  The Hollywood Bowl set an attendance record of 26,410 at a performance by French opera star Lily Pons

1940s

 Bass baritone George London made his opera début in 1941 singing Dr. Grenvil in La Traviata.
American soprano Florence Quartararo made her début as Leonora in a concert performance of Il trovatore in 1945.

1950s
 September 1950:  California's official state centennial show, The California Story, ran for five performances. The production, directed by Vladimir Rosing, was immense. A chorus of 200 and hundreds of actors were employed. The shell of the bowl was removed, the stage was enlarged, and the action was expanded to include the surrounding hillsides. Lionel Barrymore provided the show's dramatic narration.
August 15, 1956: A Jazz at the Philharmonic program featuring Louis Armstrong and His All Stars, Ella Fitzgerald, Art Tatum, and Oscar Peterson became the best-attended event of the venue's history.
American Baritone Mack Harrell performed in the US première of "David" in 1956.

1960s
 The Beatles performed in 1964 and 1965, which resulted in the live album The Beatles at the Hollywood Bowl that was released in 1977. This recording was re-released in 2016 with the screams of the fans significantly reduced and sound improved with new technology by Giles Martin.
April 29, 1967: The Supremes performed as the headliners for KHJ (AM) 2nd Annual Appreciation Concert. Their performance is notable as it was the first time Cindy Birdsong stood in for an absent Florence Ballard.
 July 5, 1968: L.A. rock band The Doors performed at the Hollywood Bowl, with Steppenwolf and The Chambers Brothers as their opening acts. Recordings from this show were released in 1987 as the live album Live at the Hollywood Bowl. 
 September 14, 1968:  The Jimi Hendrix Experience appeared at the Hollywood Bowl. This concert was recorded and eventually released as part of the 50th anniversary box set of Electric Ladyland.

1970s
 August 22, 1971: The Jackson 5 performed at this venue on their Second National Tour 
 June 17, 1972: Ron "Pigpen" McKernan played his last show with the Grateful Dead.
 July 29, 1973: The World of Sid & Marty Krofft, a one-performance-only live show was filmed here and aired as a television special The World of Sid & Marty Krofft at the Hollywood Bowl. The show featured performances by Johnny Whitaker, Jack Wild with H.R. Pufnstuf characters and The Brady Bunch Kids.
 September 7, 1973: Elton John played a concert here that was filmed for inclusion in the Bryan Forbes documentary film Elton John and Bernie Taupin Say Goodbye Norma Jean and Other Things.
 1979: the inaugural Playboy Jazz Festival was held. It has taken place at the Hollywood Bowl ever since.

1980s
 1980: The Monty Python comedy troupe performs. A filmed performance is released as Monty Python Live at the Hollywood Bowl. (see below)

1990s
 July 2–4, 1991: The newly formed Hollywood Bowl Orchestra made their debut performance with Independence Day concerts on conducted by John Mauceri. The program included works by Aaron Copland, Leonard Bernstein, John Williams, George Gershwin & Jerome Kern, among others.

2000s
 July 1, 2002: The Who performed their first concert after the death of John Entwistle.
 October 1 and 2, 2007: Dave Matthews Band performs #34 with lyrics for the first time since 1993, in honor of frontman Dave Matthews' wife's 34th birthday.

2010s
 May 1,2, & 4, 2012: Coldplay performed 3 sold-out concerts at the Hollywood Bowl as part of their Mylo Xyloto Tour.
 November 8, 2013: Avicii performed at the Hollywood Bowl, becoming the first EDM artist to headline the venue.
 September 25–26, 2015: Kanye West performed his 4th solo album 808s & Heartbreak in full for the first time ever.
 October 2nd & 4th, 2015: Van Halen performed at the Hollywood Bowl to conclude their 2015 Tour. These would be the last concerts guitarist Eddie Van Halen would perform live before his passing on October 6th, 2020.
 July 1, 2016: Garrison Keillor recorded his final episode of A Prairie Home Companion from the Hollywood Bowl which was later released as a Live CD.
 October 14,15 2016: Kygo performed during his Cloud Nine Tour. The concerts were filmed in the documentary: "Kygo: Live at the Hollywood Bowl" available at iTunes.
 September 21, 22, 25: Tom Petty and the Heartbreakers completed their 40th Anniversary World Tour; final shows of Petty's career before his death on October 2.
 October 12, 2017, Depeche Mode played the first of 4 consecutive sold out nights at the Hollywood Bowl. The first band to ever sell out 4 consecutive nights at the venue.
 October 27, 2017: Linkin Park held a tribute concert for Chester Bennington
 May 12, 2018: The Iranian singer Googoosh along with the singers and songwriters Hassan Shamaizadeh and Martik Kanian performed their Memory Makers Tour. Googoosh became the first Iranian artist to headline at the Hollywood Bowl.

2020s
 May 13, 2020: Due to the COVID-19 pandemic, the entire season of film screenings and concerts was cancelled for the first time.
 2021: Billie Eilish held a no-audience concert in support of her second album, Happier Than Ever, for a concert film titled Happier Than Ever: A Love Letter to Los Angeles that released on Disney+ on September 3.
 October 8, 2021: Burna Boy made his debut at the bowl as a part of his 2021 Space Drift arena tour. He became the first African artist to headline a concert at the bowl
 May 4, 2022: Dave Chappelle performs as part of the Netflix Is A Joke Festival and is attacked on stage by an armed audience member. Chappelle was uninjured and the suspect was arrested by the LAPD. After this performance, Chappelle is now tied with Monty Python for the most headlined shows for a comedian at the venue.

Musicals at the Hollywood Bowl 
For years The Hollywood Bowl produced popular musicals that are in the mainstream and are sometimes accessible for families, such as:

Chicago starring Samantha Barks and Ashlee Simpson, A Chorus Line starring Ross Lynch and George Lopez, Annie starring Lea Salonga and Ana Gasteyer, Les Misérables starring Lea Michele and Rosie O'Donnell, Hair starring Kristen Bell and Hunter Parrish, West Side Story starring Jeremy Jordan and Karen Olivo, Into The Woods starring Sutton Foster and Skylar Astin, My Fair Lady starring John Lithgow and Melissa Erico, Rent  starring Vanessa Hudgens and Aaron Tveit, Mamma Mia starting Dove Cameron and Corbin Bleu and more.

The next was about to be School Of Rock starring Cynthia Erivo but that was cancelled due to the COVID-19 pandemic.

Hollywood Bowl Museum
The Hollywood Bowl Museum is located at the bottom of Peppertree Lane. It was formerly known as the Tea Room which opened in 1984. In 1996, it was rebuilt as the Edmund D. Edelman Hollywood Bowl Museum. It features many historical exhibits including: Summer Nights: Jazz at the Bowl, Hollywood Bowl: Music For Everyone, Postcards from the Bowl, Beatles at the Bowl, Concert Programs and Live from the Bowl. These exhibits feature vintage photographs, vintage sound equipment, newspaper clippings, postcards, live video recordings, and live audio recordings. 

The Hollywood Bowl Museum also features memorabilia and artifacts about the history of the Hollywood Bowl and performances. The museum includes the Hollywood Bowl Hall of Fame, whose honorees include John Williams, Reba McEntire, Garth Brooks, Stevie Wonder, Brian Wilson, Henry Mancini, Sarah Chang, Bernadette Peters, George Harrison, Frank Sinatra and more. The Hollywood Bowl Museum offers free admission, free self-guided tour options, free guided tour options and educational programs. The educational program, Music Mobile, is a volunteer program and offers musical instrument lessons to students twice a year. If the Hollywood Bowl Museum is closed visitors can walk through "The Bowl Walk" which features historical photographs of the Hollywood Bowl.

Hollywood Bowl green initiatives 
"The Hollywood Bowl is the first amphitheater in California to be certified as an Audubon Society Cooperative Sanctuary." Los Angeles Philharmonic Association and Los Angeles County are partners with the Hollywood Bowl and encourage recycling. The Hollywood Bowl has many recycling bins located throughout the venue. The Hollywood Bowl has also partnered with Los Angeles County Metropolitan Transportation Authority (formerly Southern California Rapid Transit District) since 1953 and provides the public with green alternatives to driving, including shuttle buses. Know Before You Go is provided as a detailed guide offering public transport information and free bike parking options. The Hollywood Bowl has waterless urinals and flush-reducing toilets to preserve water as well as a satellite-based irrigation system to control water use. This irrigation system also provides water based on the needs of animal life. The Hollywood Bowl has stainless steel grates and water filters to keep its irrigation system clean.

See also

 Live at the Hollywood Bowl (disambiguation)
 List of contemporary amphitheatres
 List of Los Angeles Historic-Cultural Monuments in Hollywood
 National Bowl
 Waikiki Shell
 Sidney Myer Music Bowl
 Tom and Jerry in the Hollywood Bowl
 Long-Haired Hare
 CNE Bandshell
 Korean Music Festival

References

Further reading

External links

 
 The Story of a Hollywood Bowl Soundman
 "A Day in the Life" brief podcast about music at the venue.

 
Amphitheaters in California
Band shells
Concrete shell structures
Culture of Hollywood, Los Angeles
Landmarks in Los Angeles
Music venues in Los Angeles
Event venues established in 1922
Hollywood Hills
Museums in Los Angeles
Media museums in California
Santa Monica Mountains